The  St. Louis Gateway Film Critics Association Award for Best Animated Film is an award given by the St. Louis Gateway Film Critics Association, honoring the finest achievements in animated filmmaking. Toy Story is the only franchise with multiple wins, winning three times for Toy Story 2 (1999), Toy Story 3 (2010) and Toy Story 4 (2019).

Winners

2000s

2010s

2020s

Lists of films by award
Animated
Awards for best animated feature film